The 1976 season of 1. deild karla was the 22nd season of second-tier football in Iceland.

Standings

Playoff for an Úrvalsdeild place
The team in second place in 1. deild met the team in last place in the 1976 Úrvalsdeild for a place in the 1977 Úrvalsdeild, as teams in Úrvalsdeild and 1. deild were increased from 9 to 10. Þór A. won this playoff.

Playoff round for two 1. deild places

The team in last place in 1. deild met the teams in 2nd and 3rd in the 1976 2. deild in a playoff round for two 1. deild places. The team in 1st place in the 2. deild (Reynir S.) had already been promoted.

References

1. deild karla (football) seasons
Iceland
Iceland
2